Musaeva Madinabonu Bahriddin qizi (born 10 October 1990), most commonly known by her stage name Madina Mumtoz, is an Uzbek singer and actress. The singer was awarded the Nihol State Prize in 2010.

Madina has also achieved great success in acting. Madina received widespread recognition and acclaim in Uzbekistan after starring in the 2009 Uzbek drama "Janob hech kim" (Mr. Nobody). Since then she has starred in many Uzbek comedy films. In particular, the films "From myself to myself", which were shown on the big screens in 2010, and "Now My Dad is Single" brought great fame to the actress.

Biography 
Madina Mumtoz was born on October 10, 1990 in Tashkent. The singer's father is Musaev Bahriddin Jo'rayevich. Madina is the daughter of well-known actress, Honored Artist of Uzbekistan Rano Yarasheva. The singer studied at the Uzbek Conservatory. The singer has appeared with her mother Rano Yarasheva in several films, including "From Myself to Myself" (2009), "Ichkuyov" (2009), "My Brother is Single" (2011), "Widows" (2012) and "Now My Dad Is Single" (2012). The singer was married in 2012 to businessman Murad Chusti. Today they have three sons. The singer gave birth to children named Muhammad Yusuf in 2013, Muhammad Yunus in 2015 and Yahya in 2020.

Filmography 
This is a chronologically-ordered list of films in which Madina Mumtoz has appeared.

Discography

Music videos

Awards 
Madina Mumtoz has received many awards. Most notably "Nihol" which is an Uzbek award given to recognize excellence of professionals in the music and film industries. The singer was awarded the "Nihol State Prize" in 2010.

References

External links
 
 Official Instagram page

1990 births
Living people
Uzbekistani film actresses
21st-century Uzbekistani women singers
21st-century Uzbekistani actresses
Musicians from Tashkent
Folk-pop singers
Actors from Tashkent